Gregory Manchess is an American illustrator from Kentucky. His illustrations have appeared in magazines, digital murals, illustrated movie posters, advertising campaigns and book covers  including sixty covers for Louis L’Amour. His work has appeared on Major League Baseball World Series Programs, Time, Newsweek, The Atlantic Monthly, Playboy, The Smithsonian and National Geographic.  His style includes broad brush strokes and excellent figure work.

Life 
He earned a BFA from the Minneapolis College of Art and Design in 1977.  He spent the next two years as a studio illustrator with Hellman Design Associates which was led by Gary Kelley.

He lectures frequently at universities and colleges nationwide and gives workshops on painting at the Norman Rockwell Museum in Stockbridge, MA. He leads an Illustration Master Class in Amherst, MA.

Manchess' first graphic novel, Above The Timberline, was published by Saga Press in 2017. Original artworks from the book were on display at the Norman Rockwell Museum. He is represented by Richard Solomon.

Work
 Abraham Lincoln Presidential Library and Museum in Springfield, Illinois - Portraits of Abraham Lincoln
 National Geographic Society expedition to the Fond du Lac river in Canada for the 1996 article "David Thomson: The Man Who Measured Canada"
 National Geographic Society illustrations for "The Wreck of the C.S.S. Alabama"
 National Geographic exhibition - “Real Pirates: The Untold Story of The Whydah, from Slave Ship to Pirate Ship”
 The Chronicles of Narnia: The Lion, the Witch and the Wardrobe  - Concept Illustrator 2005
 2009 Oregon Statehood Stamp by the United States Postal Service
 Literary Arts series; Mark Twain Stamp by the United States Postal Service
 NASA mission patches
SpaceX Crew-1
SpaceX Crew-2
SpaceX Crew-3

Book covers
Nightrunners, Joe R Lansdale, Dean R. Koontz 1987

Ninja Vol III Warrior Path of Togakure by Stephen K. Hayes 1991

To Capture The Wind, Sheila MacGill-Callahan, August 1997

Nanuk: Lord of the Ice, Brian Heinz, 1999

Cover Her Face, Simon & Schuster, P. D. James 2001

Stories of Your Life and Others, Tor Books, Ted Chiang 2002

Death of an Expert Witness, Simon & Schuster, P. D. James 2001

The Alchemist's Door, Macmillan, Lisa Goldstein 2003

Dreamer of Dune: The Biography of Frank Herbert, Macmillan, Brian Herbert 2004

The Knight, Tor Books, Gene Wolfe, January 2004

Giving Thanks, Turtleback School & Library Binding, Jonathan London, September 2005

The Last River: John Wesley Powell and the Colorado River Exploring Expedition Mikaya Press, Stuart Waldman October 2005

Glory Road, Macmillan, Robert Heinlein and Samuel Delany 2008

Cheyenne Medicine Hat, Brian Heinz, September 2006

Grania: She-King of the Irish Seas, Morgan Llywelyn, February 20, 2007

The Vengeful Virgin, Gil Brewer, April 2007

Magellan's World Mikaya Press, Stuart Waldman October 2007

An Irish Country Doctor, Macmillan, Patrick Taylor 2011

Real Pirates: The Untold Story of the Whydah from Slave Ship to Pirate Ship, National Geographic Books, Barry Clifford, 2008

Zero Cool, Michael Crichton (as "John Lange"), March 2008

Lamentation (The Psalms of Isaak, Volume 2) Tor Books, Ken Scholes February 2009

Lobster Johnson: The Satan Factory, Dark Horse, Thomas E. Sniegoski June 2009

Canticle (The Psalms of Isaak, Volume 2) Tor Books, Ken Scholes October 2009

Robert E Howard's Complete Conan of Cimmeria 1935: v.3 (Leather Bound Edition) Book Palace Books, Robert E Howard February 2010

An Irish Country Girl: A Novel, Macmillan, Patrick Taylor 2011

A Weeping Czar Beholds the Fallen Moon, Tor Books, Ken Scholes

Looking for Truth in a Wild Blue Yonder, Tor Books, Ken Scholes and Jay Lake

The Starship Mechanic, Tor Books, Ken Scholes and Jay Lake

Awards
Nominated for a Caldecott Medal in 1977

Society of Illustrators New York
 Gold medal
 Silver medals
 Hamilton King Award in 1999
 Stephan Dohanos Award in 2000

Society of Illustrators Los Angeles
 Silver medals
 Best in Show Award.

Artist's Magazine
 First Prize Wildlife Art Competition 1990

Communication Arts
 1995
 Featured in 1996, 1998, and 2000 in Step-By-Step Graphics.

Spectrum
 Silver medal in 2001

Exhibitions
Eleanor Ettinger Galleries in New York and Hong Kong
Witham Gallery; Ohio - 1997
Walt Reed Gallery; Westport, Connecticut - “The Illustrator in America, 1860–2000”.
Members Gallery at the Society of Illustrators - February 1, 2011 - February 26, 2011
Arte Verissima Gallery - "Weightless" - January 24, 2015 - March 8, 2015

References

External links 
 
 Greg Manchess paints "Above The Timberline" – video of Gregory Manchess' painting process

American illustrators
Living people
American portrait painters
20th-century American painters
American male painters
21st-century American painters
21st-century American male artists
Minneapolis College of Art and Design alumni
Year of birth missing (living people)
20th-century American male artists